2278 Götz, provisional designation , is a dark background asteroid from the inner regions of the asteroid belt's background population, approximately  in diameter. It was discovered on 7 April 1953, by German astronomer Karl Reinmuth at the Heidelberg Observatory in southwest Germany. The F/C-type asteroid was named after astronomer Paul Götz.

Orbit and classification 

Götz is non-family asteroid of the main belt's background population (formerly being classified as a member of the Nysa family by Zappala). It orbits the Sun in the inner main-belt at a distance of 2.1–2.8 AU once every 3 years and 10 months (1,403 days). Its orbit has an eccentricity of 0.15 and an inclination of 4° with respect to the ecliptic.

The body's observation arc begins with its official discovery observation at Heidelberg. Simultaneously, the asteroid was also observed at the Almaty Observatory in Kazakhstan .

Naming 

This minor planet was named in memory of Paul Götz (1883–1962), a German astronomer and discoverer of minor planets, who was the first assistant of Max Wolf at Heidelberg in the early 1900s, using the observatory's Bruce telescope and 0.15-meter astrograph. The official naming citation was proposed and prepared by G. Klare and L. D. Schmadel and was published by the Minor Planet Center on 27 June 1991.

Physical characteristics 

In the Tholen classification, the asteroid has an ambiguous spectral type, closest to the F-type and somewhat similar to the carbonaceous C-type asteroid.

Diameter and albedo 

According to the survey carried out by the NEOWISE mission of NASA's Wide-field Infrared Survey Explorer, Götz measures 11.769 kilometers in diameter and its surface has an albedo of 0.039.

Rotation period 

As of 2018, no rotational lightcurve of Götz has been obtained from photometric observations since its discovery in 1953. The asteroid's rotation period, pole and shape remain unknown.

References

External links 
 Asteroid Lightcurve Database (LCDB), query form (info )
 Dictionary of Minor Planet Names, Google books
 Asteroids and comets rotation curves, CdR – Observatoire de Genève, Raoul Behrend
 Discovery Circumstances: Numbered Minor Planets (1)-(5000) – Minor Planet Center
 
 

002278
Discoveries by Karl Wilhelm Reinmuth
Named minor planets
002278
19530407